This is a list of Greek football transfers for the 2019–20 winter transfer window. Only transfers featuring Super League 1 and Super League 2 are listed.

Previous window: summer 2019.
Next window: summer 2020.

Super League 1

Note: Flags indicate national team as has been defined under FIFA eligibility rules. Players may hold more than one non-FIFA nationality.

PAOK

In:

Out:

Olympiacos

In:

Out:

AEK Athens

In:

Out:

Atromitos

In:

Out:

Aris

In:

Out:

Panionios

In:

Out:

Lamia

In:

Out:

Panathinaikos

In:

Out:

Panetolikos

In:

Out:

AEL

In:

Out:

Asteras Tripolis

In:

Out:

Xanthi

In:

Out:

OFI

In:

Out:

Volos

In:

Out:

Super League 2

Note: Flags indicate national team as has been defined under FIFA eligibility rules. Players may hold more than one non-FIFA nationality.

PAS Giannina

In:

Out:

Levadiakos

In:

Out:

Apollon Smyrnis

In:

Out:

Platanias

In:

Out:

Apollon Larissa

In:

Out:

Ergotelis

In:

Out:

Panachaiki

In:

Out:

Chania

In:

Out:

Apollon Pontou

In:

Out:

Doxa Drama

In:

Out:

Kerkyra

In:

Out:

Karaiskakis

In:

Out:

See also
 2019–20 Super League 1
 2019–20 Super League 2

References

External links
 Official site of the EPO
 Official site of the Super League 1
 Official site of the Super League 2

Football transfers winter 2019–20
Trans
2019–20